A by-election was held for the New South Wales Legislative Assembly electorate of Sydney Hamlets on 10 October 1856 because Stuart Donaldson was appointed Colonial Treasurer in the Parker ministry. Under the constitution, ministers were required to resign to recontest their seats in a by-election when appointed. Of the other ministers, Henry Parker narrowly won the by election for Parramatta. John Darvall comfortably won the by-election for Cumberland North Riding, and William Manning comfortably won the by-election for Cumberland South Riding. Only John Hay (Murrumbidgee) was re-elected unopposed.

Dates

Result

Stuart Donaldson was appointed Colonial Treasurer in the Parker ministry.

Aftermath
Stuart Donaldson re-gained a seat in the parliament at the November 1856 by-election for Cumberland South Riding,

See also
Electoral results for the district of Sydney Hamlets
List of New South Wales state by-elections

References

1856 elections in Australia
New South Wales state by-elections
1850s in New South Wales